Mende, Hungary is a village in Pest County, Hungary.

Population 
The small city of Mende has a population of 4,149 population living in 152.7 /km² (395.5 /sq mi)

Mende Railway Disaster (1968) 

Located on railway track from Budapest to Békéscsaba, Mende is known for the second worst railway accident in post-war Hungary. On December 22, 1968, a passenger train from Budapest Eastern Station to Szolnok collided with a freight train from Szolnok. 43 people were killed, most of them were women and children in the first two waggons.
The passenger train rolled on the wrong, "left" track because his own was freshly re-opened after repair and a railway officer had forgotten that.

Climate 
Mende has an Oceanic climate, with a Köppen climate classification of Cfb.

Footnotes

Bibliography

Populated places in Pest County